is a Japanese voice actress from Shizuoka Prefecture. She is affiliated with Ken Production. After passing an audition in 2011, she made her debut as a voice actress in 2012, and she played her first main role in 2016. She is known for her roles as Sagiri Izumi in Eromanga Sensei, Sistine Fibel in Akashic Records of Bastard Magic Instructor, and Celia Claire in Seirei Gensouki: Spirit Chronicles.

Life and career
Fujita had an interest in voice acting since at least her junior high school years, since she had regularly been watching anime, and she had friends who were anime and voice actor fans. According to her, one reason she decided to become a voice actor was because she "wanted to do something that was fun". During her high school years, she was a part of her school's broadcasting club. As a third-year student, she participated in a national broadcasting competition sponsored by NHK. In 2011, she decided to participate in an audition organized by the agency Ken Production. She passed the audition, and pursued studies at a voice acting training school while also pursuing university studies.

Fujita made her voice acting debut in 2012, voicing the character Yuri in the video game Generation of Chaos: Pandora’s Reflection. She would then play a number of supporting roles in anime series such as Aikatsu!, Chihayafuru, Magical Warfare, and Pokémon XY & Z. In 2015, she was cast as Yukari Mizumoto in The Idolmaster Cinderella Girls and Megumi Uda in High School Fleet. She was also cast as the character Sagiri Izumi in an online radio drama adaptation of the light novel series Eromanga Sensei.

In 2016, she made her adult game voice acting debut with Tayutama 2: You're the Only One, under the name .

In 2017, Fujita reprised the role of Sagiri in the anime television series adaptation of Eromanga Sensei. She also performed the song , which was used as the ending theme for the series' eighth episode. That same year, she was cast as the character Sistine Fibel in the anime series Akashic Records of Bastard Magic Instructor; she and co-stars Yume Miyamoto and Ari Ozawa performed the series' ending theme "Precious You". She also played the roles of Leviathan in the anime series Seven Mortal Sins and Kaiko Mikuniyama in the anime series A Sister's All You Need. She performed the song , which was used as an insert song in the second episode of Seven Mortal Sins, and the song , which was used as the ending theme to the ninth episode of A Sister's All You Need. In 2018, she voiced Fū Sagami in Release the Spyce.

Voice roles

Anime television series
 Aikatsu! (2012–2016), Akane Mimori, Shizuka Kisaki, Minami Hateruma
 Chihayafuru 2 (2013), Napa Payakaroon, female student
 Heroes: Legend of the Battle Disks (2013), Sophie
 Magical Warfare (2014), Ida Futaba
 Death Parade (2015), Sae
 Pokémon XY & Z (2015), Bara
 The Idolmaster Cinderella Girls (2015), Yukari Mizumoto
 High School Fleet (2016), Megumi Uda/Megu-chan
 Mahou Shoujo Nante Mouiidesukara (2016), Yuzuka Hanami
 Orange (2016), Kakeru Naruse (young), child, female student
 Akashic Records of Bastard Magic Instructor (2017), Sistine Fibel
 Eromanga Sensei (2017), Sagiri Izumi
 Seven Mortal Sins (2017), Envy Demon Lord Leviathan
 A Sister's All You Need (2017), Kaiko Mikuniyama
 Release the Spyce (2018), Fū Sagami
Inazuma Eleven: Ares no Tenbin (2018), Tsukushi Ootani
 W'z (2019), Haruka
 Mini Toji (2019), Kiyoka Musumi
 Senran Kagura: Shinovi Master (2018), Senkō
 A Certain Scientific Accelerator (2019), Leader
 A Certain Scientific Railgun T (2020), Leader
 Iwa-Kakeru! Sport Climbing Girls (2020), Akane Uchimura
 Bottom-tier Character Tomozaki (2021), Tsugumi Narita
 Osamake (2021), Midori Shida
 How Not to Summon a Demon Lord Ω (2021), Babaron
 Seirei Gensouki: Spirit Chronicles (2021), Celia Claire
 Chillin' in My 30s After Getting Fired from the Demon King's Army (2023), Marika

Anime film
 High School Fleet: The Movie (2020), Megumi Uda

Video games
 Dragon Quest builders 2 (2018), Heroine
 Generation of Chaos: Pandora’s Reflection (2012), Yuri
 Tokyo 7th Sisters (2014), Rena Araki
 Granblue Fantasy (2014), Renie
 The Idolmaster Cinderella Girls (2015), Yukari Mizumoto
 The Idolmaster Cinderella Girls Starlight Stage (2015), Yukari Mizumoto
 Aikatsu! Photo on Stage (2016), Minami Hateruma
 Girls' Frontline (2016), G36C, Five-seveN
 Infinite Stratos: Archetype Breaker (2017), Fanil Comet
 Arknights (2019), Bibeak, Shamare
 Genshin Impact (2020), Sucrose
 Shinobi Master Senran Kagura: New Link (2017) Senkō
 Azur Lane (2019), USS Shangri-La, USS Bataan
 Riddle Joker (2018), Mibu Chisaki
 9 -nine- Kokonotsu Kokonoka Kokonoiro (2017), Yuuki Noa
 9 -Nine- Sorairo Sorauta Soranooto (2018), Yuuki Noa
 9 -Nine- Haruiro Harukoi Harunokaze (2019), Yuuki Noa
 9 -Nine- Yuukiiro Yukihana Yukinoato (2020), Yuuki Noa
 Tayatuma 2 -You are the Only One- (2016), Mito Kohaku
 Tayatyma 2 -After Stories (2017), Mito Kohaku
 Soi Kano ~Gyutto Dakishimete~ (2017), Kamkura Yoake
 Death end re;Quest (2018), Lydia Nolan
 Kimi to Mezameru Ikutsuka no Houhou (2018), Hirakata Hatsune
 Sakura, Moyu. -As the Night's, Reincarnation- (2019), Mashiro, Kuro
 Aonatsu Line (2019), Kotone Shiino
 pieces / Wataridori no Somnium (2019), Kimihara Yua
 Café Stella to Shinigami no Chou (2019), Shiki Natsume
 Death end re;Quest 2 (2020), Lydia Nolan
 Girls Book Maker ~Grimm to Sannin no Ohime-sama 1~ (2020), Shirayuki
 Kami-sama no You na Kimi e (2020), Tsukuyomi
 pieces / Yurikago no Canaria (2020), Kimihara Yua
 Hyrule Warriors: Age of Calamity (2020), Impa
 Final Fantasy VII Remake Intergrade (2021), Nayo
 Luminous Avenger iX 2 (2022), Vespa
 Blue Archive (2022), Miyako Tsukiyuki
 Made in Abyss: Binary Star Falling into Darkness (2022), Dorothea

Dubbing
 People Places Things, Clio

References

External links
 Official agency profile 
 

1993 births
Living people
Voice actresses from Shizuoka Prefecture
Japanese video game actresses
Japanese voice actresses
21st-century Japanese actresses
Ken Production voice actors